Fernando Fernandes (7 June 1920 – 28 March 1991) was a Portuguese hurdler. He competed in the men's 400 metres hurdles at the 1952 Summer Olympics.

References

1920 births
1991 deaths
Athletes (track and field) at the 1952 Summer Olympics
Portuguese male hurdlers
Portuguese decathletes
Olympic athletes of Portugal
Place of birth missing